Homona auriga is a species of moth of the family Tortricidae. It is found on New Guinea, where it has been recorded from Papua, Indonesia.

References

Moths described in 1915
Homona (moth)